Ernő Mihályfi (3 September 1898 - 20 November 1972) was a Hungarian politician, who served as Minister of Foreign Affairs in 1947. He learned in the Budapest University of Technology and Economics then fought in the First World War. After the war, he worked as a journalist. Between 1923 and 1924, he worked and lived in the United States. Mihályfi was member of the Independent Smallholders, Agrarian Workers and Civic Party. He also served as Minister of Information and later as Deputy Speaker of the National Assembly. He was member of the parliament until his death.

References
 Magyar Életrajzi Lexikon

1898 births
1972 deaths
People from Nógrád County
People from the Kingdom of Hungary
Independent Smallholders, Agrarian Workers and Civic Party politicians
Foreign ministers of Hungary
Members of the National Assembly of Hungary (1945–1947)
Members of the National Assembly of Hungary (1947–1949)
Members of the National Assembly of Hungary (1949–1953)
Members of the National Assembly of Hungary (1953–1958)
Members of the National Assembly of Hungary (1958–1963)
Members of the National Assembly of Hungary (1963–1967)
Members of the National Assembly of Hungary (1967–1971)
Members of the National Assembly of Hungary (1971–1975)
Budapest University of Technology and Economics alumni